Yann Fouéré (26 July 1910 – 20 October 2011), also known as Seàn Mauger was a Breton nationalist and a European federalist. His French birth certificate names him as  Jean Adolphe Fouéré, a French name, as the French Third Republic did not allow Breton names.

Life
Fouéré was born in Aignan, Gers, France. He fled the country after the Liberation of France in 1945 and took Irish citizenship in the early 1950s. He founded the Parti pour l'organisation d'une Bretagne libre ("Movement for the Organisation of a Free Brittany"), and was one of the founders of the Celtic League along with his compatriot Alan Heusaff. He also co-founded the European Free Alliance

Fouéré was alleged to have been a collaborator during World War II, but was fully exonerated in 1955 following his voluntary return to France to face trial.

He was a member of the Knights of the Sovereign Order of Jerusalem.

Europe of 100 Flags
Fouéré popularized the idea of a "Europe of 100 Flags", in which a federal Europe would not be based on the currently existing nations, but instead on regional polities, the "100 Flags".  The continent would "divide to unite" and "decentralize inwardly and federate outwardly." The idea has been adopted by some organizations in the Identitarian movement.

Family and death
Fouéré's daughter with his wife, Marie-Magdeleine Mauger is Irish actress Olwen Fouéré.

Fouéré died in Saint-Brieuc, Brittany, France at the age of 101.

Works
English
 Towards a federal Europe, 1968; 

French
 La Bretagne Ecartelée: Essai pour servir à l'histoire de dix ans. 1938-1948. Paris: Nouvelles éditions latines, 1962 
 L'Europe aux Cent Drapeaux: Essai Pour Servior a La Construction de l'Europe. Paris: Presses d'Europe, 1968 
 En prison pour le FLB Front de Libération de la Bretagne Paris: Nouvelles Editions Latines 1977 
 Histoire résumée du mouvement Breton, du XIXe siècle à nos jours (1800–1976). Quimper: Editions Nature et Bretagne, 1977 
 Ces Droits que les autres ont mais que nous n'avons pas. Quimper: Editions Nature et Bretagne, 1979 
 with Youenn Didro – L'Histoire du quotidien La Bretagne et les silences d'Henri Fréville. Saint-Brieuc: Les Cahiers De L'Avenir de la Bretagne, 1981 
 Problèmes Bretons du Temps Présent. Saint-Brieuc: Les Cahiers de l'Avenir, 1983 
 La Patrie interdite: Histoire d'un Breton. Editions France Empire, 1987 
 La maison du connemara: Histoire d'un Breton 2. Editions Coop Breizh, 1995 
 Europe ! Nationalité bretonne… Citoyen français?. Coop Breizh, 2000;  Celtics Chadenn, 2003 {{isbn}9782847220186}}
 with Thierry Jigourel, Jean Cevaër, et al. – Projet de loi portant statut d'autonomie pour la Bretagne. Saint-Brieuc: Parti pour l'organisation d'une Bretagne libre, 2001

References

External links
Official Fondation Yann Fouéré website

1910 births
2011 deaths
Irish people of Breton descent
Breton nationalists
French centenarians
Irish centenarians
Men centenarians
Naturalised citizens of Ireland
People from Gers
Stateless nationalism in Europe
French emigrants to Ireland